is a Tongan-born, Japanese international rugby union player who plays as a centre. He received Japanese citizenship in 2017.

International

After 12 Top League appearances, and 7 tries, for Kubota Spears Teaupa received his first call-up to his adopted country, Japan's senior squad ahead of the 2017 end-of-year rugby union internationals.

References

1992 births
Living people
Japanese rugby union players
Tongan rugby union players
Japan international rugby union players
Rugby union centres
Kubota Spears Funabashi Tokyo Bay players
Sunwolves players
Tongan expatriates in Japan